The 1993 Guatemala constitutional crisis took place in 1993 when then President Jorge Serrano Elías attempted a self-coup or autogolpe. On Tuesday May 25, 1993, Serrano illegally suspended the constitution, dissolved Congress and the Supreme Court, imposed censorship and tried to restrict civil freedom.

The attempted self-coup was similar to the one carried out by Alberto Fujimori, but unlike Fujimori's, had no popular support: Serrano's action met with strong protests by most elements of Guatemalan society, at the forefront of which was the Siglo Veintiuno newspaper under the leadership of José Rubén Zamora. This was combined with international pressure (the Organization of American States condemned the autogolpe), and the army's enforcement of the decisions of the Constitutional Court, which ruled against the attempted takeover.

In the face of this pressure, Serrano resigned as president and fled the country. He was replaced on an interim basis by his vice president, Gustavo Espina.  However, Espina was judged by the Constitutional Court to have been involved in the coup as well, and Congress replaced him with Human Rights Ombudsman Ramiro de León.

Self-coup
In the early morning hours of Tuesday May 25, 1993, President Jorge Serrano Elías suspended the Constitution, dissolved the Congress, disbanded the Supreme Court, and declared himself dictator for the next two and one half years.
He also suspended 59 articles of the Guatemalan Constitution. At the same time, Serrano called on the Supreme Electoral Tribunal to convoke elections for a National Constituent Assembly in 60 days.

Serrano had seriously overestimated his support from the military and underestimated the international diplomatic reaction to his coup. Furthermore, his move had the unintended effect of catalyzing opposition not only to his leadership but to the whole structure of backroom military power that he had hoped would support him, thus bringing together an unlikely coalition of progressive business interests, human rights groups, and Maya activists that would play an important role in the 1996 Peace Accord negotiations.

In a last bid to stay in office, Serrano tried to recall the Congress which he had dissolved in May. Few responded and Serrano was forced to step down. He subsequently fled to El Salvador under military protection on June 2. Serrano’s departure provoked another crisis when on June 2 another of his supporters, Vice-President Gustavo Espina Salguero, proclaimed himself President. Espina was prevented from taking office on the evening of June 2 when only 44 deputies attended Congress to approve his swearing-in. On June 4, the Court of Constitutionality ruled that Espina was not eligible for the presidency due to his support for Serrano’s coup. The Court ordered the Congress to reconvene and elect a new President within 24 hours.

References

Guatemala
Constitutional Crisis
Guatemalan Constitutional Crisis
Guatemalan Civil War
Military coups in Guatemala
Political history of Guatemala
Guatemala
Guatemala
Guatemala